Mustasch is the fifth studio album by Swedish heavy metal band Mustasch. The album, released in 2009, peaked at No. 5 on the Swedish albums chart.

Track listing

Charts

Weekly charts

Year-end charts

References

2009 albums
Mustasch albums